Mepal  is a village in Cambridgeshire, England. Mepal is part of the East Cambridgeshire district, and is located just north of the A142 road between Ely and Chatteris.

History
First recorded at the start of the 13th century Mepal's history has always been tied up with that of The Fens and the village is less than ten metres above sea level. One of the smaller villages of the Isle of Ely, Mepal lies at the western end of the Isle on what was once the shore between the fenland and the higher ground of the Isle.

The Old Bedford River and the New Bedford River (also known as the Hundred Foot Drain) run very close on the northwestern side of the village, and the only important bridges of the rivers are found in Mepal. The old and new rivers, originally modified by the Victorians, offer the main drainage route for the Fens and retain a major flood plain between  the two river beds.  The flood plain typically floods between November and March of each year.

A major fire devastated the village in the 19th century, leading to a drop in population from 510 to 397 between 1861 and 1871. There are thus very few remaining buildings dating from before the 19th century.

Listed as Mepahala at the start of the 13th century, the village's name means "Nook of land of a man called Meapa."

RAF Mepal
Mepal retains the historical pride of being the home of 75 Squadron RAF, which was operational between 1943 and 1945.  It held the enviable post of being the prior home to No. 75 'New Zealand' Squadron which was equipped with Lancaster bombers. 75 Sqn flew the highest total operations for the whole of RAF Bomber Command, 8017 in total.  Mepal is visited on an annual basis by previous members of the Squadron and their families, as part of remembrance. A museum jointly dedicated to RAF Mepal and RAF Witchford is located in the nearby village of Witchford.

Church

The parish church, dedicated to St Mary, dates from the 13th century and has been largely unaltered since. It is notable as the only church in the Isle of Ely without either tower or spire, having a bellcote instead.

Village life
The village of Mepal retains a pub (The Three Pickerels), a post office and a primary school. Former public houses include the Cross Keys, in which Clement Freud lived when he was Member of Parliament for the Isle of Ely in the 1970s and early 1980s.

From Monday to Saturday Mepal has a two-hourly bus service (no Sunday service) to Chatteris, Ely and Cambridge.

Botanical 
Adjacent to St Mary's church is a small woodland notable for the old elm trees, believed to be Plot elm hybrid.

See also
Cornelius Vermuyden
Mepal Airfield
Old Bedford River
New Bedford River

References

External links 

Mepal Village

Villages in Cambridgeshire
Civil parishes in Cambridgeshire
East Cambridgeshire District